Borislav Novaković, MSc (Cyrillic: Мр. Борислав Новаковић; born October 21, 1964, in Novi Sad) is a Serbian politician. He is a vice-president of People's Party. From 2000 to 2004, as a member of Democratic Party Novaković was the President of the city Assembly of Novi Sad. After failing re-election, this time in direct popular vote, he was appointed as Vice-President of the Assembly of the Autonomous Province of Vojvodina in 2004.

He graduated in sociology from the University of Novi Sad Faculty of Philosophy, where he also worked as a lecturer.

References

1964 births
Living people
Mayors of Novi Sad
Politicians of Vojvodina
Academic staff of the University of Novi Sad
University of Novi Sad alumni
Democratic Party (Serbia) politicians